Eunidia pseudannulicornis is a species of beetle in the family Cerambycidae. It was described by Stephan von Breuning in 1964.

Subspecies
 Eunidia pseudannulicornis pseudannulicornis Breuning, 1964
 Eunidia pseudannulicornis yaoundeana Breuning, 1969

References

Eunidiini
Beetles described in 1964